Thorstein Kråkenes (3 April 1924 – 17 September 2005) was a Norwegian competition rower and Olympic medalist. He received a bronze medal in coxed eights at the 1948 Summer Olympics, as a member of the Norwegian team. His brother Harald was a member of the same Olympic team. His brother Sverre is also a competition rower, who participated in the 1952 and 1960 Olympic games.

Kråkenes received a bronze medal in coxless four at the 1949 European championships. He participated in men's four at the 1952 Summer Olympics.

References

1924 births
2005 deaths
Sportspeople from Bergen
Norwegian male rowers
Olympic rowers of Norway
Rowers at the 1948 Summer Olympics
Rowers at the 1952 Summer Olympics
Olympic bronze medalists for Norway
Olympic medalists in rowing
Medalists at the 1948 Summer Olympics
European Rowing Championships medalists